Tomal is an artisanal caste among Somali people.

Tomal or TOMAL may also refer to:

Ttangkkeut, a headland and village in South Korea
TOMAL (Test of Memory and Learning), a neuropsychological test
TOMAL, a plant of diamond equipment in Tomilino, Russia
 (adjective) related to tomium
Tomal (surname)